Do Eun-cheol (born 24 March 1963) is a South Korean former cyclist. He competed in the points race at the 1988 Summer Olympics.

References

External links
 

1963 births
Living people
South Korean male cyclists
Olympic cyclists of South Korea
Cyclists at the 1988 Summer Olympics
Place of birth missing (living people)
Asian Games medalists in cycling
Asian Games silver medalists for South Korea
Cyclists at the 1986 Asian Games
Medalists at the 1986 Asian Games